The Ottawa Swans is an Australian rules football club based in Ottawa, Ontario, Canada.

The club is notable as being the first and currently only Australian rules football club to represent the city of Ottawa.

The Ottawa Swans Australian Football Club played 3 exhibition games in 2007 before becoming a not-for-profit society in 2008.  It entered the AFL Ontario (OAFL) as a member team in 2008, playing home games on a pitch built in the infield of the Rideau Carleton Raceway in Ottawa's south end.

The inaugural team of the Ottawa Swans Australian Football Club was led on the field by captain Steve Spurrell and coached by Richard Keane, who also played in the majority of games.

The Swans' first victory (as part of the Ontario Australian Football League) occurred on 11 July 2009 in the 3rd annual Canada Day Cup. The Swans defeated the Guelph Gargoyles 13.8.86 to 3.7.25 at the Rideau Carleton Raceway. It took the Swans 20 games to get their first win (13 losses in the first season and 6 in the second).

The Swans posted the first away victory in round 10 of the 2009 season against the High Park Demons at Humber College North. The final score was 12.6.78 to 3.7.25 .

2012 saw the introduction of the women's team, finishing a very successful inaugural season in 2nd spot after the home and away season and 3rd overall after being defeated by the Hamilton Wildcats in the second week of finals.

The Swans' Men's first finals (post-season) berth occurred in season 2013 after finishing the season in 5th spot. They were defeated in the first round Elimination Final by the Toronto Rebels 5.10-40 to 1.9-15 

In season 2014, the Swans women's squad won the first premiership in the club's history, defeating the Hamilton Wildcats in the Grand Final 7.9.51 to 2.2.14.

For the 2015 season the Women's team joined AFLQuebec, a 9-a-side competition, and split their team in two, competing as the Carleton Warriors & Rideau Shamrocks. The Men's team remained in AFLOntario. The Carleton Warriors went on the win back to back Premierships in 2015 & 2016.

2018 saw the Ottawa Swans Men's team win their maiden premiership. After a perfect season having won all 12 regular season games, the Swans won all three finals including the Grand Final over the 2017 premiers the Toronto Eagles at Humber College South 10.10 70 - 6.5 41.  The Women's side fought hard all season in their return to the AFLO. They took the battle to the Roos in the Grand Final, but unfortunately were not successful in winning their first Premiership since 2014.

In 2019, the Ottawa Swans Men's team continued to find success, winning all their regular season games and final matches enroute to hard fought victory against the Hamilton Wildcats to claim back to back Premierships. The Women's team put together an impressive regular season with only one loss, but we're not able to replicate their finals magic.

In 2020, the AFL Ontario season was cancelled due to the Covid pandemic.

Club Awards

League awards
(Men's) OAFL Grand Final Best and Fairest

(Men's) OAFL Grand Final Best and Fairest

 2018 Pat Eefting
(Women's) AFLQ Grand Final Best and Fairest

 2016 Belinda Wozniak
 2015 Ash Scott

(Men's) OAFL  Best and Fairest

2022 Jordan Harcombe
2019 Cory Townder
2014 Tom Stafford
(Women's) AFLQ Leading Goalkicker

 2016 Belinda Wozniak

(Men's) OAFL Canadian Best and Fairest

2018 Jordan Harcombe
2015 Nathan Strom
(Women's) AFLQ Most Improved Player 

 2016 Dora Bartulovic

(Men's) OAFL Rookie Of The Year
2018 Brent Williams
2008 Ryan Gregory

(Women's) OAFL/AFLQ Rookie Of The Year
2016 Belinda Wozniak (AFLQ)
2012 Emma Dickinson (OAFL)

(Men's) OAFL Coach Of The Year
2019 Nathan Strom
2018 Matthew Powell

(Women's) OAFL Coach Of The Year

2019 Greg Simpson

(Men's) OAFL All-Star Team
2022 Corey Herrington (CHB), Greg Bridges (HBF), James Clock (Wing), Geoff Coventry (HFF), Jordan Harcombe (FF), Michael Masek (I/C), Greg Bridges (assistant coach)
2019 John O'Connor, Cory Townder, Cameron Brown (VC), Greg Bridges, Mic Masek, Nathan Strom (coach)
2018 Jordan Harcombe,  Alex Huard, Cameron Ralph, Cameron Brown, Mic Masek, Morgan Whyte, Nathan Strom, Matthew Powell (coach)
2017 Nathan Strom (Captain - HF), Jordan Harcombe (R), Ronan Shaughnessy (Bench), Morgan Whyte (Back), Matthew Powell (assistant coach)
2016 Nathan Strom (VC), Alex Huard (I/C), Morgan Whyte (Ruck), Ronan Shaughnessy (midfield), Blair Oliver (HF), Rod Frank (assistant coach)
2015 Nathan Strom (VC) (HFF), Jordan Harcombe, Ronan Shaughnessy
2014 Nathan Strom, Mike Kowzlowski, Ronan Shaughnessy, Tom Stafford, Rod Frank (assistant coach)
2013 Mike Kowzlowski (HF), Nathan Strom (Wing), Ronan Shaughnessy (I/C) Rod Frank (assistant coach)
2012 Mike Kozlowski (CHB)
2011 Chris Peck (Bench)
2008 Ryan Gregory (Bench)

(Men's) OAFL Canadian All-Ontario Team

 2017 Nathan Strom (Captain - HF), Jordan Harcombe (R), Ronan Shaughnessy (HB), Morgan Whyte (HB), Matthew Powell (assistant coach)

(Womens) OAFL/AFLQ All-Star Team
2022 Caroline Leduc (HFF), Charlotte Biot (I/C) Evaline Harmsen (I/C), Yaser Abou Elenein (assistant coach)
2019 Michelle Huard (VC), Margret Wernuik, Holly Vachon, Amanda Smith, Harmony Sluiman, Charlotte Biot, Greg Simpson (coach)
2018 Michelle Huard, Vivian Nguyen, Holly Vachon, Rebecca Rousseau, Margret Wernuik, Erica Sabbath, Greg Simpson (coach)
2017 Margret Wernuik, Courtney Diotte, Roberta Kramchynsky, Anke Patzelt, Krystal Novak (AFLQ)
2016 Margret Wernuik, Vivian Nguyen, Holly Vachon, Rebecca Gomez, Beth Sheffield, Dora Bartulovic, Belinda Wozniak (AFLQ)
2015 Margaret Wernuik, Catherine Geci, Kelly Cambridge, Holly Vachon, Dora Bartulovic, Laurea Stoot, Vivian Nguyen (AFLQ)
2014 Margo Legault, Emma Dickinson, Holly Vachon, Amiee Legault, Vivian Nguyen, Chris Lockhart (coach)
2013 Kirsten Bodashefsky (Rover), Emma Dickinson (Centre), Holly Vachon(HF) 
Northwind (National Canadian Team) Players
2022 Jordan Harcombe, James Clock, Riley Joseph, Geoff Coventry, Michael Masek, Greg Bridges
2017 Morgan Whyte, Alex Huard, Greg Bridges, Kyle Graham
2014 Nathan Strom, Mike Kozlowski, Adam Nash
2009 Ryan Gregory, Chris Lockhart, Graeme Millen

Northern Lights (National Canadian Team) Players
2022 Caroline Leduc, Charlotte Biot
2017 Vivian Nguyen, Rebecca Gomez, Margo Legault, Aimee Legault
2014 Emma Dickinson, Holly Costanza, Kirsten Bodashefsky, Margo Legault, Aimee Legault

Club Honour Board

References

External links
 

Sw
Australian rules football clubs in Canada
Ontario Australian Football League clubs
2006 establishments in Ontario
Australian rules football clubs established in 2006